The 1983 Giro d'Italia was the 66th edition of the Giro d'Italia, one of cycling's Grand Tours. The Giro began in Brescia, with a team time trial on 13 May, after the annulment of the prologue individual time trial the day before. Stage 12 occurred on 25 May with a stage from Pietrasanta. The race finished in Udine on 5 June.

Stage 12
25 May 1983 — Pietrasanta to Reggio Emilia,

Stage 13
26 May 1983 — Reggio Emilia to Parma,  (ITT)

Stage 14
27 May 1983 — Parma to Savona,

Stage 15
28 May 1983 — Savona to Orta San Giulio,

Stage 16a
29 May 1983 — Orta San Giulio to Milan,

Stage 16b
29 May 1983 — Milan to Bergamo,

Stage 17
30 May 1983 — Bergamo to Colli di San Fermo,

Stage 18
31 May 1983 — Sarnico to Vicenza,

Rest day 2
1 June 1983

Stage 19
2 June 1983 — Vicenza to Selva di Val Gardena,

Stage 20
3 June 1983 — Selva di Val Gardena to Arabba,

Stage 21
4 June 1983 — Arabba to Gorizia,

Stage 22
5 June 1983 — Gorizia to Udine,  (ITT)

References

1983 Giro d'Italia
Giro d'Italia stages